Popular Unity may refer to:

 Popular Unity (Greece) (Laïkí Enótita), a left-wing Greek parliamentary group founded in 2015
 Popular Unity (Chile), a left-wing political alliance in Chile that supported Salvador Allende in 1970
 Popular Unity (Italy, 1953), a minor social-democratic party Italy
 Popular Unity Candidacy, a left-wing and pro-Catalan independence political party founded in 1986
 Popular Unity (Spain), a left-wing Spain political party founded in 2015
 Popular Unity (Montenegro) (Montenegrin; Narodna Sloga) a short-lived political alliance in Montenegro, founded in 1996
 Popular Unity (Uruguay), a left-wing political alliance in Uruguay

See also 
 Popular Unity Party (disambiguation)